Dizon is a Filipino surname derived from the Hokkien Chinese term 二孫 (Pe̍h-ōe-jī: di-sun) which means second grandchild. It can refer to:
Allen Dizon, Filipino actor
Jordon Dizon, American football player
José Dizon, Filipino revolutionary
Leah Dizon, American entertainer
Lilia Dizon, postwar Filipino actress
Mylene Dizon, Filipino actress
Rolando Ramos Dizon, Filipino politician
Ryzza Mae Dizon, Filipina teen actress and television personality
Sunshine Dizon, Filipino actress

Tagalog-language surnames
Hokkien-language surnames